There are 23 U.S. Highways that exist entirely or partially in the U.S. state of South Carolina.  In South Carolina, all U.S. Highways are maintained by the South Carolina Department of Transportation (SCDOT).


Mainline highways

Special routes

See also

References

External links

US